Edmund Concanon was Irish solicitor and town commissioner from 1816–1902.

Concanon was reputedly descended from the kings of Uí Díarmata. By the 18th century their property was much reduced, and they converted from Catholicism to the established Protestant church. In this was they held onto the remain of the property in the parish of Killascobe; Concanon's father named the family home "Waterloo" in commemoration of Wellington's victory.

Because he was a younger son, Concanon did not inherit the family property. He gained employment at the ecclesiastical court of Archbishop Trench in Tuam. In time he acquired properties himself around the town. He set up business as a land agent at The Mall in the early 1850s and within ten years began practising in the local courts. In this capacity, he defended the Fenian, Michael Fahy (Fenian), in 1865. He was also a defence solicitor in the Maamtrasna murders case in 1882.

He married a Roman Catholic, Catherine Parsons of Dublin. The first child was baptised as a Catholic, but the following nine were raised Protestant.

Concanon was a member of the town's cricket club (the town ran two teams), spoke Irish and was a noted step-dancer. On his death he was interred in the family vault at Killascobe.

References

People from County Galway